Asian Americans are a fast growing ethnic group in the US state of Nevada. As of the 2020 U.S. Census, Asian Americans were 9.1% of the state's population, or 378,672 people.

Filipinos are the largest Asian ethnic group in the state. In Clark County, the four largest Asian groups are Filipino (52%), Chinese (12%), and Native Hawaiian/Pacific Islander and Indian (both 7%). The largest Asian ethnic groups in Nevada are Filipino (168,200), Chinese (53,234), Japanese (28,366), Vietnamese (21,719), Korean (17,743), and Indian (14,602).

Politics
As of 2022, Asians make up about 10 percent of Nevada’s eligible voters, comprising a larger share compared to any state except Hawaii and California.

Demographics

References

Further reading
 The Peoples Of Las Vegas: One City, Many Faces
 The Chinese in Nevada

Asian-American culture in Nevada